Larissa Nevierov (born 18 September 1974 in Trieste) is an Italian sailor who won the Laser Radial World Championships in 1998.

She participated in three editions of the Summer Olympics (2000, 2004, 2008). Now she is coach of the Italian women's Laser Radial national team.

References

External links
 
 
 
  

1974 births
Living people
Italian female sailors (sport)
Olympic sailors of Italy
Sailors at the 2000 Summer Olympics – Europe
Sailors at the 2004 Summer Olympics – Europe
Sailors at the 2008 Summer Olympics – Laser Radial
Sportspeople from Trieste
Mediterranean Games silver medalists for Italy
Competitors at the 2005 Mediterranean Games
Mediterranean Games medalists in sailing
21st-century Italian women